Linn Markley Farrish (October 3, 1901 – September 11, 1944) was an American rugby union player and alleged spy.

Rugby

Farrish competed in the 1924 Summer Olympics. He was a member of the American rugby union team, which won the gold medal.

Espionage
Farrish was a member of the Office of Strategic Services (OSS) during the Second World War. While acting as the OSS liaison officer to Josip Tito's Yugoslav Partisans, as part of Maclean Mission (Macmis), he submitted a one-sided assessment of anti-Nazi resistance, grossly exaggerating the effectiveness of the Communist Partisans and denigrating the anti-Communist Chetniks as collaborators. He was also allegedly serving Soviet intelligence. Farrish is referenced in the following Venona project decryption: 1397 KGB New York to Moscow, 4 October 1944. His code name in Soviet intelligence, as deciphered in the Venona project, was "Attila". He died in an aircraft crash in the Balkans in September 1944. 

Biographer Mark Ryan states "Patriotic Farrish would never do anything to harm his beloved USA." Fitzroy Maclean jocularly referred to him in his memoir Eastern Approaches as "my American chief of staff". Farrish was also referred to as "Lawrence of Yugoslavia" (as was William M. Jones).

Sources
John Earl Haynes and Harvey Klehr, Venona: Decoding Soviet Espionage in America, Yale University Press (1999), pp. 194-195.
M. Stanton Evans, Blacklisted by History: The Untold Story of Senator Joe McCarthy and His Fight Against America's Enemies, Random House (2007), pp. 95-97.

References

1901 births
1944 deaths
American rugby union players
Rugby union players at the 1924 Summer Olympics
Olympic gold medalists for the United States in rugby
United States international rugby union players
People of the Office of Strategic Services
American spies for the Soviet Union
American people in the Venona papers
World War II spies for the Soviet Union
Victims of aviation accidents or incidents in 1944
Victims of aviation accidents or incidents in Yugoslavia
Medalists at the 1924 Summer Olympics
American civilians killed in World War II